Cato Township is a civil township of Montcalm County in the U.S. state of Michigan. The population was 2,920 at the 2000 census.

Cato Township was established in 1857.

Communities
Bass Beach was a resort village platted by George Whitcomb and his wife in 1889.
Lakeview is a village within the township.

Geography

Demographics
As of the census of 2000, there were 2,920 people, 1,073 households, and 789 families residing in the township. The racial makeup of the township was 96.71% White, 0.17% African American, 0.41% Native American, 0.27% Asian, 0.07% Pacific Islander, 0.65% from other races, and 1.71% from two or more races. Hispanic or Latino of any race were 2.71% of the population.

There were 1,073 households, out of which 34.6% had children under the age of 18 living with them, 58.3% were married couples living together, 10.9% had a female householder with no husband present, and 26.4% were non-families. 22.2% of all households were made up of individuals, and 11.3% had someone living alone who was 65 years of age or older.  The average household size was 2.67 and the average family size was 3.07.

In the township the population was spread out, with 28.8% under the age of 18, 7.6% from 18 to 24, 28.4% from 25 to 44, 19.6% from 45 to 64, and 15.6% who were 65 years of age or older.  The median age was 36 years. For every 100 females, there were 92.4 males.  For every 100 females age 18 and over, there were 90.4 males.

The median income for a household in the township was $35,919, and the median income for a family was $40,625. Males had a median income of $31,304 versus $22,000 for females. The per capita income for the township was $15,495.  About 8.7% of families and 11.4% of the population were below the poverty line, including 13.6% of those under age 18 and 10.8% of those age 65 or over.

References

Notes

Sources

Townships in Montcalm County, Michigan
1857 establishments in Michigan
Populated places established in 1857
Townships in Michigan